A cove is a small type of bay or coastal inlet.

Cove or coving may also refer to:

Places

United Kingdom
 Cove, Argyll, village in Scotland
 Cove, Hampshire, village in England
 Cove, Highland, village in Scotland
 Cove, Scottish Borders, Berwickshire
 Cove Bay, a suburb of Aberdeen, Scotland

United States
 Cove, Arizona
 Cove, Arkansas
 Cove, Missouri
 Cove, Oregon
 Cove, Texas
 Cove, Utah

Other places
 Cove, Ireland, a former name of the town Cobh
 Cové, a city in Benin
 Cove Pond, Anguilla
 Cove LRT station, an LRT station on the Punggol LRT line East Loop in Singapore

Sport
 Cove F.C., an association football club in Cove, Hampshire, England
 Cove Rangers F.C., an association football club in Cove Bay, Aberdeen, Scotland

Other uses
 Cove (Appalachian Mountains), a type of valley found in the Appalachian Mountains, US
 Cove (brand), a dishwasher brand produced in the US
 Cove (standing stones), a megalithic feature
 Cove (woodworking), a concave groove
 CoVE, Centre of Vocational Excellence
 Coving (interior design), a strip of material used to cover transitions between surfaces or for decoration
 Coving (urban planning), a method of layout for housing subdivisions

See also
 Malham Cove, a cliff in Yorkshire, England
 The Cove (disambiguation)
 Cove School (disambiguation)